Rodley may refer to:

Rodley (car), a British microcar built between 1954 and 1956

Places

Rodley, West Yorkshire, a village in West Yorkshire, England
Rodley, Gloucestershire, a village in Gloucestershire, England

People
J. Ellis Rodley (1852–1919), President of the Chico, California Board of Trustees, (1897–1899)
James Rodley (born 1985), New Zealand rugby union player
Nigel Rodley (1941–2017), British lawyer and academic
Chris Rodley, film-maker and co-author of Lynch on Lynch